Oxford Road Cricket Ground is the home of Dinton CC  and a cricket ground in Dinton, Buckinghamshire.

Although the site has existed as Dinton CC'S ground since the 19th century, the first recorded county fixture here was in 2001, when Buckinghamshire played the Worcestershire Cricket Board in a List-A match in the 1st round of the 2002 Cheltenham & Gloucester Trophy.  The following year the ground held its second List-A match when Buckinghamshire played Suffolk in the 1st round of the 2003 Cheltenham & Gloucester Trophy.

Dinton Cricket Club play in the Home Counties Premier Cricket League.

References

External links
Dinton Cricket Club Ground on CricketArchive
Oxford Road Cricket Ground Dinton on Cricinfo

Cricket grounds in Buckinghamshire
Sports venues completed in 2001